Rosende is a surname and may refer to:

Diego Rosende (born 1986), Chilean footballer
Petrona Rosende (1797–1863), first female journalist in Argentina
Roberto Rosende, American philatelist